Dui Prithibi is a 2015 Bangladeshi romantic drama film. The film screenplay and directed by FI Manik and produced and distributed by Shondhani Kotha Chitra. It was written and dialogue by Mohammad Rafiquzzaman. The film feature Shakib Khan, Apu Biswas and Ahona Rahman in the lead roles. Syed Hasan Imam, Alamgir, Abul Hayat, Kazi Hayat, Ali Raj, Parveen Sultana Diti, Dolly Johur, Rasheda Chowdhury, Mizu Ahmed, Sadek Bachchu, Misha Sawdagor, Shiba Shanu and Ilias Kobra played supporting roles in the film. The film soundtrack composed by Emon Saha.

Cast
 Shakib Khan as Tonmoy
 Apu Biswas
 Ahona Rahman
 Syed Hasan Imam
 Alamgir
 Abul Hayat
 Kazi Hayat
 Ali Raj
 Parveen Sultana Diti
 Dolly Johur
 Rasheda Chowdhury
 Mizu Ahmed
 Sadek Bachchu
 Misha Sawdagor as Haidar Khan
 Shiba Shanu
 Ilias Kobra

Production
The film began in 2010 but stopped shooting in the middle. After about 5 years, the film work start again in 2015. The film was wrapped up with shot a song on May 12, 2015 in Bashundhara City, Dhaka.

Marketing and release
The film official trailer revealed on May 27, 2015 on Tiger Media's YouTube channel.

Release
The film released on June 5, 2015 in 85 theatres all over country.

References

External links
 

Bengali-language Bangladeshi films
2010s Bengali-language films
2015 films
Bangladeshi romantic drama films
2015 romantic drama films
Films scored by Emon Saha